A stampede is uncontrolled concerted running by a large herd of animals, including humans.

Stampede may also refer to:

Calgary Stampede, a yearly fair and exhibition held in Calgary, Alberta
Idaho Stampede, an NBA Development League team
Dolly Parton's Stampede, formerly Dixie Stampede, a chain of dinner attractions 
Stampede ECS, a 2010 Nerf Blaster released under the N-Strike series

Music 
Stampede (band), a British hard rock band
Stampede (The Doobie Brothers album), 1975
Stampede (Krokus album), 1990
Stampede (Hellyeah album), 2010
Stampede (Chris LeDoux album), 1996
Stampede (Critters Buggin album), 2004
Stampede (Concussion Ensemble album), 1993
"Stampede", a big room house song by Dimitri Vegas & Like Mike, Dvbbs and Borgeous

Film and television 
Cattle Stampede, a 1943 Billy the Kid Western film
Stampede (1936 film), an American western film
Stampede (1949 film), a Western directed by Lesley Selander
KAM Stampede, a fictional race team in Future GPX Cyber Formula
Stampede J-1001, a fictional race car in Future GPX Cyber Formula
Vash the Stampede, the protagonist of the Trigun manga and anime series
One Piece: Stampede, the fourteenth feature film based on the One Piece manga and anime series

Computers 
Stampede (video game), a 1981 video game
Stampede, a supercomputer at the Texas Advanced Computing Center
Cache stampede, a type of cascading failure involving caches

See also
A clinical trial investigating treatments for terminal prostate cancer
List of human stampedes
List of accidents and disasters by death toll, includes many human crushes